"Step by Step" (stylized as "Step by step") is a song by Japanese singer-songwriter Ayumi Hamasaki. It was released on July 1, 2015, as the digital lead single from her EP Sixxxxxx. The song was used as the theme song for the Yukie Nakama-starring NHK TV drama Bijo to Danshi.

Although the song did not enter the Oricon Singles Chart, it did peak at number 21 on the Billboard Japan Hot 100 Chart.

Background
"Step by step" was first mentioned in April 2015. Eventually, it was announced that the song would be used as the theme song for the NHK drama Bijo to Danshi, starring Yukie Nakama. The song was then released as a digital single on July 1, 2015.

Writing and production
The song's lyrics were written by Hamasaki herself, with music by Tetsuya Yukumi. Long-time collaborator Yuta Nakano served as the song's arranger.

Release
The song was released as an exclusively digital single on July 1, 2015, with "July 1st" serving as a digital B-side.

Promotion
On July 1, 2015 - the day of the single's release - a short version of the song's music video was uploaded to YouTube.
"Step by Step" was also performed during Hamasaki's Arena Tour 2015 and her appearance on the music program NHK Songs.

Music video
A music video for the song was included on Sixxxxxx. It depicts Hamasaki alongside other women, who are trying to free themselves from their struggles.

Track listing

Digital download

Streaming

Charts

Personnel
Credits adapted from Discogs.

Arrangement, Programming – Yuta Nakano
Guitar – Ryota Akizuki
Lyrics – Ayumi Hamasaki
Mixing – Naoki Yamada
Music – Tetsuya Yukumi
Producer – Max Matsuura
Violin – Yu Manabe, Yuko Kajitani

References

Ayumi Hamasaki songs 
Avex Group singles 
Japanese songs
2015 songs
Songs written by Ayumi Hamasaki